The Fushun gudgeon (Gobio fushunensis) is a species of gudgeon, a small freshwater in the family Cyprinidae. It is found in China.

References

 

Gobio
Fish described in 2007
Freshwater fish of China